Albert L. Coles (November 8, 1909 – December 18, 1978) was an American politician who served in the Connecticut Senate from the 22nd district from 1939 to 1947 and as the Attorney General of Connecticut from 1959 to 1963.

References

1909 births
1978 deaths
Democratic Party Connecticut state senators
Connecticut Attorneys General
20th-century American politicians